Sorama bicolor, the two-coloured notodontid, is a moth of the family Notodontidae first described by Francis Walker in 1855. It is found in Australia.

The wingspan is about 60 mm for females and about 40 mm for males.

The larvae feed on Eucalyptus species.

References

Notodontidae